Alibi for a Judge is a 1960 comedy crime novel by the British writer Henry Cecil. After sentencing a man to serve ten years in prison, a worrisome judge becomes concerned that the alibi provided by his wife may in fact be true.

In 1965 it was adapted into a stage play of the same title by Cecil collaborating with two other authors, it appeared in the West End at the Savoy Theatre and ran for more than 300 performances.

References

Bibliography
 Kabatchnik, Amnon. Blood on the Stage, 1950-1975: Milestone Plays of Crime, Mystery, and Detection. Scarecrow Press, 2011.
 Reilly, John M. Twentieth Century Crime & Mystery Writers. Springer, 2015.

1960 British novels
Novels by Henry Cecil
Novels set in London
British comedy novels
British novels adapted into plays
Michael Joseph books